Sucket was a kind of confectionary or dessert popular in early modern England. The word is related to succade, a kind of dried fruit.

The dish was a sweetmeat involving sugar plums and dried fruit in thick syrup flavoured with ginger and other spices. The dried fruits themselves were called "suckets" or "dry suckets".

As a dessert course, sucket was sometimes brought to the table in a silver "sucket barrel" and eaten with silver forks, known as "sucket forks". These forks seem to have been the earliest table forks in use in England.

Elizabeth I was given three sugar loaves and a barrel of sucket by Lady Yorke as a New Year's Day gift in 1562.  Elizabeth ate sucket at Kenilworth Castle in 1575. Mary, Queen of Scots enjoyed sucket as a prisoner at Tutbury Castle.

References

Confectionery
Medieval cuisine